Spili is a village in Rethymno regional unit, Crete, Greece. It is the seat of the Agios Vasileios municipality.

References

Populated places in Rethymno (regional unit)